Poetic Justice is a studio album by the American glam metal band Lillian Axe, released in 1992. It was the first featuring drummer Gene Barnett and bassist Darrin DeLatte; they replaced Danny King and Rob Stratton. It was also the band's first release on I.R.S. Records, after being dropped by MCA Records.

It was recorded at Sheffield Audio-Video Productions in Phoenix, Maryland, and The Terminal in Jackson, Mississippi.

It peaked at No. 28 on Billboard's Top Heatseekers chart.

Track listing
All songs by Steve Blaze, except where indicated.
"Poetic Justice" – 0:39
"Innocence" (Blaze, Jon Ster, Ron Taylor) – 4:57
"True Believer" – 4:27
"Body Double" (Blaze, Ster, Taylor) – 4:44
"See You Someday" – 5:27
"Living in the Grey" (Blaze, Taylor) – 5:15
"Digital Dreams" – 0:50
"Dyin' to Live" – 4:25
"Mercy" – 4:14
"The Promised Land" – 4:19
"No Matter What" (Pete Ham) – 3:18 (Badfinger cover)
"She's My Salvation" – 5:30
"A Moment of Reflection" – 1:47

Personnel
Ron Taylor – lead vocals
Steve Blaze – lead guitar, backing vocals, keyboards
Jon Ster – rhythm guitar, backing vocals, keyboards
Darrin DeLatte – bass guitar
Gene Barnett – drums

References

1992 albums
Lillian Axe albums
I.R.S. Records albums